was a Japanese composer who was active from the early 1960s until 2017. He specialized in incidental music for media such as television and film. Kikuchi was regarded as one of Japan's most highly demanded film and TV composers, working principally on tokusatsu and anime productions, as well as violent action films, jidaigeki, and television dramas.

Early life and education
Kikuchi was born on 1 November 1931 in the city of Hirosaki in Aomori Prefecture. He graduated from Aomori Prefectural Hirosaki Technical High School, specializing in mechanics. Shunsuke then attended the Nihon University College of Art.

Career
After graduating from the Nihon University College of Art, he made his debut composing for the 1961 film . The Tō-Ō Nippō Press wrote that the contrast between the heroic opening theme and the melancholic ballad ending theme that Kikuchi composed for the 1969 Tiger Mask anime, "changed Japanese anime music." Kikuchi composed the song , sung by Meiko Kaji, for the early 1970s Female Convict Scorpion series was included in the American film Kill Bill and on its soundtrack. The Tō-Ō Nippō Press also wrote that the success of the TV drama Abarenbō Shōgun, which aired for 800 episodes from 1978 to 2008, had people say; "If Shunsuke Kikuchi is in charge of the music, the show will be a hit."

In 1976 kikuchi composed the music for Divine Demon-Dragon Gaiking (大空魔竜ガイキング, Daikū Maryū Gaikingu); in 1979 composed "Doraemon no Uta", the theme song of the Doraemon anime, which ran on TV for 26 years. Up-tempo works like those in Kamen Rider and Abarenbō Shōgun form the majority of Kikuchi's works, while his slow background music from long-running series have become some of his best-known works. Some notable works that he composed for, include anime and tokusatsu like Doraemon, Kamen Rider, Dragon Ball, Dragon Ball Z, jidaigeki such as Abarenbō Shōgun and Chōshichirō Edo Nikki, and TBS Saturday-night productions ranging from Key Hunter to G-Men '75 became long-running hit series.

Retirement and death
Kikuchi ceased composing music in 2017, when he stated that he was taking a break to be treated for an illness. Kikuchi died while being treated for pneumonia in a hospital in Tokyo on 24 April 2021. His death was announced four days later.

Awards
In 1983 Kikuchi was nominated for the Japan Academy Prize for Music for his work on The Gate of Youth and To Trap a Kidnapper. He received an Award of Merit at the 2013 Tokyo Anime Awards.

Kikuchi has won several annual awards from the Japanese Society for Rights of Authors, Composers and Publishers based on the royalties he earned from his works in the previous year. He won the International Award, which is based on foreign income, in 1983 (UFO Robot Grendizer), 1989 (UFO Robot Grendizer), 2008 (Dragon Ball Z), 2010 (Doraemon), 2012 (Doraemon), 2015 (Dragon Ball Z), 2016 (Kiteretsu Daihyakka), 2018 (Dragon Ball Z), and 2019 (Dragon Ball Z). He came in second in overall royalties in 2004 (Dragon Ball Z). In 2015, he received a lifetime achievement award at the 57th Japan Record Awards.

Selected works
Abare Hasshū Goyō Tabi (1991-1994)
The Unfettered Shogun / Abarenbō Shōgun (1978)
Arabian Nights: Sinbad's Adventures (1975-1976)
Babel II (1973)
Casshan (1973-1974)
Castle of Sand (1977)
Chōshichirō Edo Nikki (1983-1991)
Daimos (1978-1979)
Danguard Ace (1977-1978)
Denjin Zaborger (1974-1975)
Doraemon (1979-2005)
Dotakon (1981)
Dr. Slump and Arale-chan (1981-1986)
Dragon Ball (1986-1989)
Dragon Ball Z (1989-1996)
Dragon Ball: Yo! Son Goku and His Friends Return!! (2008)
Dragon Ball Z Kai (2011, replacing Kenji Yamamoto (composer born 1958); music taken from Dragon Ball and Dragon Ball Z)
Dragon Princess (1976)
Female Convict 701: Scorpion (1972)
Gaiking (1976-1977)
Gamera vs. Guiron (1969)
Gamera vs. Jiger  (1970)
Gamera vs. Zigra (1971)
Gamera: Super Monster (1980)
G-Men '75 (1975-82)
Getter Robo (1974-1975) and Getter Robo G (1975-1976)
Goke, Body Snatcher from Hell (1968)
High School! Kimengumi (1985-1987)
Hurricane Polymar (1974-1975)
Jumborg Ace (1973)
Kamen Rider (first series - ZX) (1971-1984)
Kiteretsu Daihyakka (1988-1996)
Kure Kure Takora (1973-1974)
La Seine no Hoshi (1975-1976)
Message from Space: Galactic Wars (1978-1979) (with Kenichiro Morioka)
Little Ghost Q-Taro (1985-1987)
Robot Detective / Robot Keiji (1973)
Ronin of the Wilderness (1972-1974)
Sakigake!! Otokojuku (1988)
Sister Street Fighter / Revenge of the Dragon / Onna Hissatsu Ken (1974)
Starzinger / Spaceketeers / Sci-Bots (1978-1979)
Tenchi in Tokyo / New Tenchi Muyo (1997)
Terror Beneath the Sea (1966)
The Fierce Battles of Edo (1979)
Tiger Mask (1969-1971) and Tiger Mask II (1981-1982)
Tōyama no Kin-san (with Ryōtarō Sugi)
UFO Robo Grendizer (1975-1977)
Zero Woman: Red Handcuffs (1974)

References

External links

 
1931 births
2021 deaths
20th-century Japanese composers
21st-century Japanese composers
Anime composers
Deaths from pneumonia in Japan
Japanese film score composers
Japanese male film score composers
Japanese music arrangers
People from Hirosaki